Don't Really Care may refer to:

"Don't Really Care", a song by Chingy from Powerballin', 2004
"Don't Really Care", a song by The Exploited from Death Before Dishonour, 1987
"She Don't Really Care", a song by Alicia Keys from Here, 2016

See also
I Don't Really Care (disambiguation)
"Really Don't Care", a 2014 single by Demi Lovato